Amplypterus mansoni is a species of moth of the family Sphingidae first described by Benjamin Preston Clark in 1924.

Distribution 
It is known from south-east Asia, including north-eastern India, Burma, Thailand, Laos, Vietnam, Malaysia and Indonesia (Sumatra and Java).

Description 
The wingspan is 110–115 mm.

Subspecies
Amplypterus mansoni mansoni
Amplypterus mansoni takamukui (Matsumura, 1930) (Taiwan)

References

Amplypterus
Moths described in 1924
Moths of Asia